Tom Shaw is Founder and Executive Producer of Digital Theatre (website).

Tom has worked for Amnesty International and has produced events such as the Sony Radio Academy Awards, BBC Jazz Awards, Music Industry Trust Award, Women In Film and Television.

Filmography
Beautiful thing, by Robert Delamere and Tom Shaw  QNQ Productions 2013

References

British theatre managers and producers
Living people
Year of birth missing (living people)